Sefid Shaban (also Romanized as Sefīd Shabān; also known as Sefīd Shīān) is a village in Kuh Panah Rural District, in the Central District of Tafresh County, Markazi Province, Iran. At the 2006 census, its population was 142, in 36 families.

References 

Populated places in Tafresh County